Batis (died 332 BC) was a eunuch and commander of the city of Gaza in the Achaemenid Empire during the 4th century BC and an antagonist of Alexander the Great during his eastern campaigns. He was executed after the lengthy siege of Gaza in which he held the city that connected the only road between Egypt and the rest of the empire, thus blocking Alexander from entering that province. Batis not only rejected entreaties to surrender the city without the fight but, even after defeat, refused to submit to the Macedonians or to acknowledge Alexander as the new King of Asia, which enraged Alexander. Reportedly, a rope was inserted through Batis' Achilles tendon and the lower bones of his legs and was dragged behind a chariot around his city walls until he died in the manner as Hector had been treated by Alexander's hero Achilles, except that Hector had already been dead when he was dragged.

References

Military leaders of the Achaemenid Empire
Opponents of Alexander the Great
4th-century BC people